Music, You All is a live album by the Cannonball Adderley Quintet, a band led by jazz saxophonist Julian "Cannonball" Adderley. It was recorded at the Troubadour in West Hollywood, California in 1972, and released in 1976 through Capitol Records. It features contributions from the quintet: Cannonball Adderley on saxophone, George Duke on piano, Walter Booker on bass, Roy McCurdy on drums and Nat Adderley on cornet, with guest appearances from Airto Moreira, Mike Deasy and Ernie Watts.

Track listing

Personnel 
The Cannonball Adderley Quintet
Julian "Cannonball" Adderley – alto saxophone, producer
George Duke – piano
Walter Booker – bass
Roy McCurdy – drums
Nathaniel Carlyle Adderley – cornet

Additional musicians 
Airto Moreira – percussion
Mike Deasy – electric guitar
Ernie Watts – tenor saxophone

Technical
David Axelrod – producer
Gene Hicks – engineering
Wally Traugott – mastering

References

External links

Music You All on Cannonball Adderley's website

1976 live albums
Nat Adderley live albums
Cannonball Adderley live albums
George Duke albums
Albums recorded at the Troubadour
Capitol Records live albums
Albums produced by Cannonball Adderley
Albums produced by David Axelrod (musician)